

Characters 
 John Atkinson - The subject of a song, he was from Murton near Appleby and was the servant of Thomas Howson, a miller. He courted the Miller's sister, and at the same time, courted and wed another, encouraged by a "friend" Thomas Skelton, who actually married them to save the fees. He broke the heart of Howson's sister and she bled to death. This song, The Barnardcastle Tragedy, sung to the tune of "Constant Anthony" appears on page 11 in Joseph Ritson's Bishopric Garland or Durham Minstrel, on page 39 in (Sir) Cuthbert Sharpe's Bishoprick Garland and page 271 in John Bell's Rhymes of Northern Bards; and tells the story and serves as a warning to other lovers.
 Thomas Wentworth Beaumont - The subject of a song and also a Member of Parliament. The song "The Colours", possibly written by Robert Surtees, appeared on page 279 of Thomas Allan's Illustrated Edition of Tyneside Songs and Readings, together with a brief bio of the events.
 Captain John Bolton of Bulmer, near Castle Howard - The subject of a song/poem. John Bolton was an Irishman, and Lieutenant in the 1st regiment of the West Riding militia. He took Elizabeth Rainbow, a single woman from the Foundling hospital at Ackworth as an apprentice. She became pregnant with his child and he strangled her with his hands and a cord and soldier's fife. Captain Bolton hanged himself in York Castle before the death sentence could be carried out. The song "A True and tragical song concerning Captain John Bolton &c" appears on page 24 of Joseph Ritson's Yorkshire Garland and sung to the tune of "Fair lady, lay your costly robes aside"
 Charles John Brandlin - The subject of a song and also a Member of Parliament. The song "The Newcastle Noodles" written by James Morrison appears on page 200 of Thomas Allan's Illustrated Edition of Tyneside Songs and Readings, page 141 of France's Songs of the Bards of the Tyne, page 169 of Fordyce's The Tyne Songster, page 166 of John Marshall's Collection of Songs, Comic, Satirical and page 9 of Marshall's Newcastle Songster. There is also a short bio in Allan's book.
 Rowland Burdon - The subject of a song/poem and also a Member of Parliament. The work "Sunderland Bridge" is written by "M W of North Shields!. For more details see "M. W" in part 1
 Thomas Burdon, Lieut. Colonel of the Tyne Hussars - The subject of a song/poem, Lieut. Colonel of the Tyne Hussars and knighted by the Prince Regent in May 1816, Mayor of Newcastle 1810 and again in 1816, as noted on page 618 of Eneas Mackenzie's history of Newcastle and Gateshead. A short bio also appears on page 199 of Thomas Allan's Illustrated Edition of Tyneside Songs and Readings
 Thomas Burt MP - The subject of a song/poem and also a Member of Parliament for Morpeth 1874-1918. He appears in two works by Robert Elliott
 Thomas Carr - The subject of several songs. T. Waller Watson brought a successful action at Newcastle Assizes, August 1823, against Thomas Carr, Captain of the Watch, for assault and false imprisonment. Carr was fined, but after failing to pay was himself imprisoned. The local poets loved it and wrote several songs about it. Among the songs written about the incident are the following :-
 "The Owl" by Robert Emery- page 306 in Thomas Allan's Illustrated Edition of Tyneside Songs and Readings, on page 342 in France's Songs of the Bards of the Tyne, on page 142 in John Marshall's Collection of Songs, Comic, Satirical and page 153 in Fordyce's The Tyne Songster
 "Tom Carr and Waller Watson - or Tom and Jerry at Home" by W Oliver - page 451 in France's book, on page 137 in Marshall's book and on page 148 in Fordyce's book
 "Johny Sc-tt & Tommy C-rr" (writer unknown) - on page 139 in Marshall's book and on page 150 in Fordyce's book
 "Tommy C**r in Limbo" - page 19 in John Marshall's Newcastle Songster, on page 140 in Marshall's Collection of Songs, Comic, Satirical's and on page 151 in Fordyce's book.
 A short bio appears of the aftermath on page 310 of Allan's book - page 153 Thomas Allan's Illustrated Edition of Tyneside Songs and Readings.
 Robert Chamber - The subject of a song and also an oarsman. One of these songs "Robert Chambers" (writer unknown) appears on page 527 of Thomas Allan's Illustrated Edition of Tyneside Songs and Readings, together with a lengthy bio.
 Henry "Harry" Clasper - The subject of a song and also an oarsman. A detailed bio appears on page 506 of Thomas Allan's Illustrated Edition of Tyneside Songs and Readings.
 John Delaval, 1st Baron Delaval - The subject of a song and also a Member of Parliament. The song "Lines on the Death of John, Lord Delaval " written by M Harvey appears on page 100 of John Bell's Rhymes of Northern Bards
 John Elliott - The subject of a song and Superintendent of Gateshead Police c1890. The song "The Wizard of the North - or The Mystic Policeman" written by Robert Emery appears on page 308 of Thomas Allan's Illustrated Edition of Tyneside Songs and Readings together with a brief bio.
 Jane Frizzle - The subject of a poem and a suspected witch. The work of 40 verses "Ode to the River Derwent" written by John Carr appears on pages 43 to 48 of (Sir) Cuthbert Sharpe's Bishoprick Garland, which includes a short bio.
 Mr (or Messrs) Green - see Green's Balloon, below
 Green’s Balloon at Newcastle - The subject of a song/songs, Charles Green and others flights in a balloon at Newcastle, were at the time, still quite a feat, as witnessed by the massive crowds that gathered. The song  "Green's Balloon" (author unknown) appears on page 202 of Thomas Allan's Illustrated Edition of Tyneside Songs and Readings which also includes brief details, on page 331 in France's Songs of the Bards of the Tyne, page 78 in John Marshall's Collection of Songs, Comic, Satirical and page 97 in Fordyce's The Tyne Songster
 King King George IV of the United Kingdom - The subject of several songs
 Graeme Clan - The subject of a song "Hughie the Graeme", about the Graeme Clan and leader, who seemed to inhabit the debatable Lands, i.e. close to the English/Scottish border. A very brief history is to be found pages 35 to 36 of Bruce and Stokoe's Northumbrian Minstrelsy
 Robert Gillespy, farmer - The subject of a song/poem. He was the farmer from Low Weetslade, near Dudley, Wideopen, Newcastle, who, on his way to school in Crow Hall in 1818, noticed two workmen cutting down hedges and picked it a twig with the idea of using it as a make-believe riding whip. He took it home with him and stuck it in the ground. At the time of his death in 1878 it had grown into a huge Willow Tree, about which Cresswell wrote his song
 The brickmaker Peter and his bride Jenny Gowen - The subject of a song/poem. The brickmaker Peter borrows a horse, and absconds (or elopes) with his girlfriend Jenny Gowen. The couple return after four days with the (worse for wear) horse, discover the girl is with child and eventually persuaded grandmother to agree to a marriage. The song "Pelton Garland" sung to the tune of "Maggy Lauder (or Lawther)" appears on page 71 of Joseph Ritson's Northumberland Garland and page 190 of John Bell's Rhymes of Northern Bards
 John Higgins - The subject of the song "Johnny Luik-up" written and sung by George Ridley
 Stephen Kemble - The subject of the song "The Barber's News - or Shields in an Uproar" by John Shield, Stephen Kemble was for a time, the very successful and much liked manager of the Theatre Royal, Newcastle. He was an extremely large individual of enormous bulk, of whom it was rather unkindly said, was the only person able to play the part of Falstaff without the use of any padding. A brief detail appears on page 76 of Thomas Allan's Illustrated Edition of Tyneside Songs and Readings.
 James Lennon - The subject of the song "The Collier's doom" by Marshall Cresswell. The song was written in memory of 33 years old James Lennon,  who was killed in an accident at Dudley Pit on 31 December 1879. It shows the esteem in which the local people of his village held him. A brief detail appears on page 95 of Cresswell's Local and other Songs and Recitations'
 George Maddison - The subject of a poem and also a British politician The work of 40 verses "Ode to the River Derwent" written by John Carr appears on pages 43 to 48 of (Sir) Cuthbert Sharpe's Bishoprick Garland, which includes a short bio.
 Alice Marley - see Elsie Marley
 Elsie Marley - The subject of a song/poem, Elsie Marley, written by unknown, An Alewife at Pictree, near Chester-le-Street. A few details are given on page 48 of (Sir) Cuthbert Sharpe's Bishoprick Garland and page 113 of Bruce and Stokoe's Northumbrian Minstrelsy
 Robert de Nevill - The subject of a song/poem, Robert de Nevill (or de Neville), Second Baron of Raby (ca1220 – 1282), was the son of Geoffrey Fitz-Robert and his wife Margaret.  The song "Lamentation on the death of Sir Robert de Nevill, Lord of Raby, in 1282" appears on page 64 of Joseph Ritson's Bishopric Garland or Durham Minstrel
 Nine Hours Strike - The subject of a song/poem, it refers to the fight for a nine-hour day, which involved a 20-week strike. The song "Nine oors a day or Common Measures" by James Anderson and sung to the tune of  "We have ne work te de doo-hoo-hoo" appears on page 126 of John W Chater's Canny Newcassel Diary and Remembrancer
 Thomas Percy, 7th Earl of Northumberland - The subject of a song/poem. Thomas Percy was one of the leaders of the Rising of the North of 1569. Charles Neville, 6th Earl of Westmorland was another of the leaders. Northumberland was captured and publicly beheaded in York for treason in 1572. Westmorland fled to Flanders and on the Spain, where he died in poverty in 1601. He was attainted (condemned for treason, entailing losing his property and hereditary titles and rights) by Parliament in 1571. The song "Rookhope Ryde" appears on page 54 of  Joseph Ritson's Bishopric Garland, page 14 in (Sir) Cuthbert Sharpe's Bishoprick Garland and page 276 of John Bell's Rhymes of Northern Bards, in each case with a varying degree of bio.
 Thomas Petty - The subject of a song/poem - see Roger Wrightson, below
 James Radclyffe, 3rd Earl of Derwentwater - The subject of a song/poem and an Earl, executed for treason as a Jacobite. Two songs/poems titled "A song on the Lord of Derwentwater" and "Verses ……. The unfortunate James, earl of Derwentwater" (authors unknown) both appear on page 225 of John Bell's Rhymes of Northern Bards
 Martha Railton and Roger Wrightson - see Roger Wrightson - The subject of a song/poem - see Roger Wrightson, below
 Elizabeth Rainbow of Ackwoth - see Captain John Bolton of Bulmer near Castle-Howard - above
 Sir Matthew White Ridley of Heaton - The subject of a song/poem and also a long-serving and popular Member of Parliament. His name appears in "Canny Newcassel" written by Thomas Thompson which appears in many of the chapbooks including on page 47 of Thomas Allan's Illustrated Edition of Tyneside Songs and Readings which also includes a very brief biography.
 Russell the pedestrian - The subject of a song/poem and an athlete (a road walker). The song is "On Russell The Pedestrian" (author unknown) which appears on page 180 of Fordyce's The Tyne Songster and also on page 181 of John Marshall's Collection of Songs, Comic, Satirical together with a short bio.
 William Hetherington Shipley - The subject of a song/poem and a parachutist appeared in the song "Shipley's Drop frae the Cloods" (author used the pseudonym "Georgie" when it was published in the Shields Gazette). The song also appears on page 575 in Thomas Allan's Illustrated Edition of Tyneside Songs and Readings with a brief bio.
 Capt John Sim - The subject of a song/poem, Captain Sim of Dundee, of the ship Antaeus, took the bar at Tynemouth during a violent storm, For this intrepid achievement he was awarded a silver cup on 1 September 1833 and the song was sung at this event. The song "Sim of Dundee" by John Shield of Newcastle, sung to the tune of "Newcastle Races" appears on page 415 of France's Songs of the Bards of the Tyne together with the brief note of the event.
 John Simpson the pedestrian - The subject of a song/poem and an athlete (a road walker). The song is "On Simpson The Pedestrian's Failure" (author unknown) which appears on page 181 of Fordyce's The Tyne Songster and also on page 182 of John Marshall's Collection of Songs, Comic, Satirical together with a short bio on page 180.
 Spottee - The subject of a song/poem, an eccentric French Sailor from Roker, Sunderland. The song "Spottee" possibly written by Thomas Clerke appears on page 50 of (Sir) Cuthbert Sharpe's Bishoprick Garland with a brief bio on the following page.
 Herbert Stockhore, the pretend author - The subject of a song/poem, Herbert Stockhore, a private in the regiment, is the "pretend" author of the song "A new song called Hark to Winchester on The Yorkshire Volunteer's farewell to the good folks of Stockton" sung to the tune of "Push about the Jorum", appears on page 35 of  Joseph Ritson's Bishopric Garland.
 George Stoole - was noted as being a "worthy gentleman" living between Gate-side Moor and Newcastle, yet he was accused of, arrested for, and condemned to death in Newcastle for the theft of cattle. At that period, the theft of animals was considered to be very serious. The theft of horses had always been considered to be extremely serious, and been punishable by death. More recent laws of the 1740s put the theft of sheep and cattle into a similar category. The song "A Lamentable Ditty on the death of worth George Stoole" sung to "a delicate Scottish Tune" and appears on page 43 of Joseph Ritson's Northumberland Garland
 Joseph Swan - The subject of a song/poem, Sir Joseph Wilson Swan was a British physicist and chemist, most famous for the invention of the incandescent light bulb. The song "The Illektric Leet", by Alexander Hay and sung to "Billy O'Booke's the Boy" appears on page 562 of Thomas Allan's Illustrated Edition of Tyneside Songs and Readings together with a short bio on Swan.
 Peter Watson - The subject of a song/poem, a common shoemaker who opposed the claims of the Government Clergy for the Easter Dues or "Clerical Tax". The song "To Mr Peter Watson - Who lays powerful bats on the knaves with fire-shovel hats on" is written by Henry Robson. It appears on page 133 of Fordyce's The Tyne Songster complete with details of the event, and also on page 122 of John Marshall's Collection of Songs, Comic, Satirical with the same details.
 Mr T Waller Watson - The subject of several songs. T. Waller Watson brought a successful action at Newcastle Assizes, August 1823, against Thomas Carr, Captain of the Watch, for assault and false imprisonment. - see Thomas Carr (above) for further details
 Charles Neville, 6th Earl of Westmorland - The subject of a song/poem, see Thomas Percy, 7th Earl of Northumberland, above
 Ernest Wilberforce - The subject of a song/poem, Ernest Roland Wilberforce was the first Anglican Bishop of Newcastle after the diocese creation in 1882 (until 1896 when he moved to become Bishop of Chichester). The song "Newcastle Toon nee Mair by Richard Oliver Heslop and sung to the tune of  "Nae luck aboot the hoose" appears on page 532 of Thomas Allan's Illustrated Edition of Tyneside Songs and Readings
 George Wilson, the Blackheath pedestrian - The subject of a song/poem and an athlete (a road walker). He appears in the song is "On Russell The Pedestrian" (author unknown) - see Russell (above) for further details
 Mr Wombwell and his animal show - The subject of a song/poem, "The Bonassus" by William Oliver, in which Mr Wombwell and his animal show visited Newcastle ca1821 and tried to pass off a buffalo as a new breed, a "Bonassus". A short bio appears on page 236 of Thomas Allan's Illustrated Edition of Tyneside Songs and Readings
 Roger Wrightson and Martha Railton - The story is told in the song "The patern of true love or Bowes Tragedy" sung to the song of Queen Dido, and appears on page 18 of Joseph Ritson's Yorkshire Garland with a lengthy bio preceding it on page 15. The subject of a song/poem. Roger Wrightson (Junior) (son of the landlord of the Kings Head Hotel, Bowes) courted Martha Railton (daughter of the widowed landlady of the George Hotel, also in Bowes). In February ?(or March) 1714 (or 1715) Roger was taken ill and "dyed" of fever a couple of weeks later. Martha was heartbroken and took to her bed only to die shortly after. They were buried in one Grave on 15 March 1714, both aged 20 years". Just before Martha died, a friend Tom Petty tried to comfort her.

The Worthies (or Eccentrics) 
 Aud (or Awd) Judy (the surname, often not used was Downey, or sometimes Downing) one of the Eccentrics
 Barbara Bell
 Barrel-bagg'd Joe
 Bet (Bouncing Bet)
 Bet (young Beagle Bet)
 Big Bob
 Billy Hush
 Bold Archy (or Airchy) Henderson
 Bugle-Nosed Jack
 Captain Benjamin Starky
 Chancellor Kell (Chuckle-head Chancellor Kell)
 Billy Conolly - an alias of and see William Cleghorn
 Jacky Coxon (sometimes Cockson)
 Robert Cruddace (also went under the alias of Whin Bob)
 Cuckoo Jack - the alias of and see John Wilson
 Cuddy Billy (or Willy) - alias of and see William Maclachlan
 Cull Billy as Silly Billy – alias of and see William Scott
 Dolly Raw (bauld Dolly Raw)
 Donald
 Doodem Daddum (with his Dog, Timour, added in the painting)
 Eccentrics
 Tommy (on the Bridge) was actually Tommy Fearns
 Bella Grey (Young Bella Grey)
 Hangy (or Hangie)
 Hell’s Kitchen (painting) - A famous painting of many of the "Eccentrics" by artist Henry Perlee Parker,
 Jenny Ballo
 Jim Bo
 Airchy Loggan
 William Maclachlan (also known as Cuddy Billy or Willy)
 Mally Ogle
 Peggy Grundy
 Pussy Willy
 Rag Sall
 Ralphy the Hawk
 Bella Roy
 Euphy Scott (or sometimes Heuffy Scott)
 William Scott - known as Cull Billy or Silly Billy
 Anty Shoe-tie
 John Spencer
 John Stephenson
 Jacky Tate
 Whin Bob - an alias of and see Robert Cruddace
 John Wilson -better known as Cuckoo Jack

Places 
 Balmbras’ Music Hall
 Billy Fairplay rules
 Black Middens
 Dry-Rig, Smale-Burns or Hanging-Well (South East of Kielder Reservoir)
 Earsdon Sword Dance
 Eastgate
 Frenchman’s Bay
 Greenhead - see Thirwall or Thirlitwall
 Hadston Skeers
 Rookhope
 Sharpness Point
 Spottee’s Cave
 Thirwall or Thirlitwall, near Greenhead and Bewcastle-dale

See also 
 Geordie dialect words
 Allan's Illustrated Edition of Tyneside Songs and Readings
 Fordyce's Tyne Songster
 France's Songs of the Bards of the Tyne - 1850
 The Bishoprick Garland (1834, by Sharp)
 Rhymes of Northern Bards
 Marshall's Collection of Songs, Comic, Satirical 1827
 The Songs of the Tyne by Ross
 The Songs of the Tyne by Walker
 Marshall's A Collection of original local songs

References

External links
 Allan's Illustrated Edition of Tyneside Songs and Readings
 The Tyne Songster by W & T Fordyce – 1840
 France's Songs of the Bards of the Tyne – 1850
 Marshall's Collection of Songs, Comic, Satirical 1827
 The Songs of the Tyne by Ross
 Sharpe's Bishoprick Garland 1834
 Bards of Newcastle
 Wor Geordie songwriters
 Bell’s Rhymes of Northern Bards
 The Songs of the Tyne by Walker

Songs related to Newcastle upon Tyne
English folk songs